Theobalds Road is a road in the Holborn district of London.  It is named after Theobalds Palace because King James I used this route when going between there and London, travelling with his court and baggage of some 200 carts.  For this reason, it was also known as the King's Way which is now the name of the nearby road, Kingsway.

A tram tunnel was built under Kingsway in 1902–1906 which had its north-eastern entrance at Theobalds Road.  When the tram network was closed in the 1950s, the Theobalds Road end was used as a flood control centre and movie location.

The road's name is usually pronounced intuitively, but traditionally it was pronounced "Tibbalds".

Notable residents
Samuel Coleridge-Taylor was born at number 15.
Benjamin Disraeli was born at number 22.

References

Streets in the London Borough of Camden